Hynce Ptáček of Pirkstein (1404 – 27 August 1444) was a Czech nobleman, the highest Hofmeister and Münzmeister of the Kingdom of Bohemia and regent of Bohemia's royal cities.

Life 
Hynce Ptáček of Pirkstein came from a side line of the noble . He was the son of Jan Ptáček of Pirkstein and Jitka of Kunštát. From 1420 he was in possession of Rataje nad Sázavou and he soon rose to the highest court master and mint master of the Kingdom of Bohemia and the acting regent of the royal cities.  As a moderate representative of the Hussites he fought in 1434 in the Battle of Lipan on the side of Prague. After Sigismund's death in 1437 he and George of Poděbrady, his protégé and future provincial administrator and King of Bohemia, joined the influential group of nobles who boycotted the election of Sigismund's son-in-law Albert II to King of Bohemia. They tried to elect the Polish king Władysław III as the new king of Bohemia.  They then nominated Władysław's brother Casimir IV Jagiello, who was only eleven years old at the time. Casimir was elected by the opposition group, but could not prevail against Albert II.  Albert II died in 1439 without male heirs, leaving the throne empty.

In 1440, Hynce Ptáček of Pirkstein along with other nobles founded the regional Landfrieden alliance, to maintain the peace.  As leader of the alliance, Hynce Ptáček of Pirkstein convened a meeting at Čáslav in 1441, where the alliance decided to take action against the robber baron , who had illegally occupied several possessions in East Bohemia.

Hynce Ptáček of Pirkstein died in 1444 and was buried in the St. Matthew's Church in Rataje nad Sázavou.

Marriage and issue 
Hynce Ptáček of Pirkstein married Anne of Neuhaus (d. 1452), daughter of Chief Mint Master . With Anna, he had a daughter, Margaret of Pirkstein, who married in 1463 Victor, Duke of Münsterberg, the second son of George of Poděbrady.

Notes

References 
Citations

Further reading
 Jan Urban: Lichtenburkové, S. 8
 Jörg K. Hoensch: Geschichte Böhmens. Beck, München 1997, p. 154–156
 Lydia Baštecká, Ivana Ebelová: Náchod. Náchod 2004, p. 51–52

External links 
 

Medieval Bohemian nobility
1404 births
1444 deaths
15th-century Bohemian people
People of the Hussite Wars